The Paraplane WD-1 Wind Dancer is an American powered parachute that was designed and produced by Paraplane International of Medford, New Jersey. Now out of production, when it was available the aircraft was supplied as a kit for amateur construction.

Design and development
It features a  Hi-Pro parachute-style wing, single-place accommodation, tricycle landing gear and a single  Rotax 447 engine in pusher configuration.

The aircraft carriage is built from a combination of aluminium and 4130 steel tubing. In flight steering is accomplished via foot pedals that actuate the canopy brakes, creating roll and yaw. On the ground the aircraft has foot-controlled nosewheel steering. The main landing gear incorporates steel spring rod suspension.

The manufacturer estimates the construction time from the supplied assembly kit as five hours.

Specifications (WD-1 Wind Dancer)

References

WD-1
1990s United States sport aircraft
1990s United States ultralight aircraft
Single-engined pusher aircraft
Powered parachutes